Riverdale is a census-designated place in Halifax County, Virginia, United States. The population as of the 2010 census was 956.

Geography
Riverdale is located in south-central Halifax County on the south side of the Dan River, an east-flowing tributary of the Roanoke River. The community is bordered to the north by the town of South Boston, the largest town in the county.

Three U.S. highways pass through Riverdale. U.S. Routes 58 and 360 enter Riverdale together from the west, leading  to Danville. The two highways cross U.S. Route 501 at what used to be the center of Riverdale but has since been annexed by the town of South Boston. US 58 and 360 split in the eastern part of Riverdale, with US 360 leading northeast  to Keysville and US 58 leading east  to South Hill.

References

Census-designated places in Halifax County, Virginia
Census-designated places in Virginia